The 2015 Audi Cup was the fourth edition of the Audi Cup, a two-day association football tournament that featured four teams and was played at the Allianz Arena in Munich, Germany. The competition hosted the 2009 Audi Cup winners Bayern Munich, the 2014 UEFA Champions league winners Real Madrid, 18-time Italian champions Milan, and eight-time FA Cup and two times UEFA Cup winners Tottenham Hotspur.

Participating teams
 Bayern Munich
 Real Madrid
 AC Milan
 Tottenham Hotspur

Competition format
The competition took the format of a regular knock-out competition. The winners of each of the two matches on the first day competed against each other for the Audi Cup, while the two losing sides played in a third-place match. The trophy contested over two days, each day seeing two matches played back-to-back.

Matches
All times are local (CEST / UTC+02:00)

Semi-finals

Third place match-up

Final

Goalscorers
2 goals
 Robert Lewandowski (Bayern Munich)

1 goal
 Gareth Bale (Real Madrid)
 Juan Bernat (Bayern Munich)
 Tom Carroll (Tottenham Hotspur)
 Nacer Chadli (Tottenham Hotspur)
 James Rodríguez (Real Madrid)
 Mario Götze (Bayern Munich)

References

Audi Cup
Audi Cup